Leonid Mykolayovych Novokhatko is a Ukrainian politician; former Minister of Culture of Ukraine (2013-2014).

References

External links 
 Biography

1954 births
Living people
People from Poltava Oblast
Culture ministers of Ukraine
Party of Regions politicians
Recipients of the Order of Merit (Ukraine), 3rd class